Avraham Marek Klingberg (7 October 1918 – 30 November 2015), known as Marcus A. Klingberg, was an Israeli scientist and the highest ranking Soviet spy ever caught in Israel. The case of Klingberg is regarded as one of the most destructive spy scandals in the history of the State of Israel.

Biography

Early life
Klingberg was born in Warsaw, Poland, in 1918, to a Hasidic Jewish family of rabbinical lineage. In his youth, he lived for a time with his grandfather, Rabbi Moshe Chaim Klingberg. His parents sent him to a cheder, or religious primary school. As a teenager, he turned his back on religious life and enrolled in a mainstream high school.

In 1935, Klingberg began studying medicine at the University of Warsaw. In 1939, when World War II started with the German invasion of Poland, Klingberg escaped to the Soviet Union. There, he completed his medical studies in Minsk.

World War II

On 22 June 1941, the first day of the German invasion of the Soviet Union, he volunteered for the Red Army, and served as a medical officer on the front lines until October 1941, when he was wounded in the leg by shrapnel. He recovered, and was then assigned to Perm in the Urals as an epidemiologist. 

In 1943, he attended the postgraduate course in epidemiology in Moscow at the Central Institute for Advanced Medical Training and finished it with distinction. That same year, he was part of a team that stopped an epidemic in the Urals. He also made a contribution into research toward typhoid fever. Toward the end of December 1943, the first parts of Byelorussia were retaken by the Red Army and Klingberg became Chief Epidemiologist of the Byelorussian Republic. 

At the end of the war, Klingberg was discharged from the Red Army with the rank of captain, and returned to Poland. There he found out that his parents and his only brother died on 19 August 1942 in the Treblinka extermination camp. In Warsaw he served as Acting Chief Epidemiologist at the Polish Ministry of Health.

While living in post-war Poland, Klingberg met Adjia Eisman, who went by the name Wanda Yashinskaya. A microbiologist by profession, she was a survivor of the Warsaw Ghetto. She had escaped and managed to survive the war due to her Aryan appearance. They married, and in 1946, they decided to emigrate to the West. They moved to Sweden shortly afterward, where their daughter Sylvia was born in 1947. It is believed that Klingberg first came into contact with Soviet intelligence while living in Sweden.

Life in Israel

In November 1948, Klingberg immigrated to the newly formed state of Israel, which was in the closing stages of its War of Independence, with his wife and daughter. Within the Israeli intelligence community, and especially among those with close knowledge of the case, it is believed that the MGB told him to emigrate to Israel so he could spy for them, but he strongly denied this in an interview. 

Although Klingberg said that he was not a Zionist, he claimed that he moved to Israel because he was a Jew and because the Soviet Union supported Israel at that time. He was drafted into the Israel Defense Forces, and served in the Medical Corps. In March 1950, he advanced to the rank of lieutenant colonel (Sgan Aluf). He served as Head of the Department of Preventive Medicine and afterward he founded and chaired the Central Research Laboratories for Military Medicine.

In 1957, he joined the top-secret Israel Institute for Biological Research (IIBR) in Ness Ziona (south of Tel Aviv), where he served as Deputy Scientific Director (until 1972). He also served as Head of the Department of Epidemiology until 1978. In 1969, Klingberg joined the Sackler Faculty of Medicine of Tel Aviv University, and was Professor of Epidemiology and Head of the Department of Preventive and Social Medicine from 1978 to 1983. 

Klingberg's academic career and research papers earned him an international reputation in his field, and he was invited to take part in conferences by the World Health Organization. He was president of the European Teratology Society (1980–1982); and a co-founder and chairman (1979–1981) of the International Clearinghouse for Birth Defects Monitoring Systems (ICBDMS). He also served as president of the International Steering Committee for the Seveso Accident (Italy) from 1976 to 1984. In 1981, he co-founded the International Federation of Teratology Societies and in 1982 at the congress of the International Epidemiological Association that was held in Edinburgh, Scotland, he was elected to its council.

Klingberg spent his sabbaticals at the Henry Phipps Institute, University of Pennsylvania, Philadelphia, United States, from 1962 to 1964; at the National Institute for Public Health, Oslo, Norway (1972); at the Department of Medical Statistics and Epidemiology, London School of Hygiene and Tropical Medicine, London, UK (1973); at the Department of Social and Community Medicine, University of Oxford and became a Visiting Fellow of Wolfson College, Oxford (1978).

At the time of his arrest, Klingberg served as series editor: Contributions to Epidemiology and Biostatistics. S. KARGER –
Basel-Paris-London-New York, and as co-chief editor: Public Health Reviews (an International Quarterly. International Scientific
Publications, Tel Aviv, Israel).

Klingberg's daughter, Sylvia, became a left-wing activist in Israel and member of the socialist anti-Zionist movement Matzpen. In 1975, she married Ehud Adiv, an Israeli political activist serving a prison sentence on charges of spying for Syria, in a ceremony held in Ayalon Prison. They divorced after three years. Sylvia Klingberg later emigrated to France, where she became a communist activist and married French philosophy professor Alain Brossat. Their son, Ian Brossat, is since 2008 a member of the Paris City Council for the French Communist Party. Sylvia died in October, 2019.

Espionage and capture
Klingberg renewed his contacts with Soviet intelligence and began spying in the 1950s. According to his indictment, which was based on his confession, he began spying in 1957. From then to 1976, Klingberg passed information about the activities in Israel's chemical and biological fields. Israel's foreign and domestic intelligence agencies, Mossad and Shin Bet, began to suspect Klingberg of espionage in the 1960s, but shadowing brought no results. While at the Institute for Biological Research, he was twice summoned by the authorities due to suspicions of him being a foreign agent. Klingberg refuted these claims, and in 1965 he passed a polygraph test, reportedly due to the fact that his interrogators simply asked the wrong questions, as they suspected he was spying for Polish rather than Soviet intelligence.

In the 1950s, Klingberg was awarded the Order of the Red Banner of Labour in recognition of his service to the Soviet Union.

In 1982, a Soviet Jew who immigrated to Israel after being granted an exit visa approached the Israeli security services and told them that the KGB had recruited him as a spy. Shin Bet subsequently ran him as a double agent, and through him, obtained strong circumstantial evidence that Klingberg was a Soviet spy. Despite this, the Shin Bet had not obtained solid evidence that would be admissible in court, and decided to elicit a confession out of him. In January 1983, Shin Bet officers informed Klingberg they wanted to send him to Singapore where a chemical plant allegedly blew up. After leaving home with his suitcase, he was taken not to the airport but to an apartment in some undisclosed location where he was interrogated harshly and put under psychological pressure to confess. After ten days, Klingberg admitted to being a Soviet mole and signed a confession. He claimed that he had provided information to the Soviet Union only for ideological reasons.

Klingberg was tried in secret and sentenced to 20 years in prison. For the first 10 years of his 20-year sentence he was held in solitary confinement, in a high security prison, under a false name and a fabricated profession. After he was removed from solitary confinement, his cellmate was Shimon Levinson, another Israeli who spied for the Soviet Union.

In September 1990, Klingberg's wife Wanda died. In accordance with her wishes, she was cremated. Her ashes were buried in the Père Lachaise Cemetery in Paris.

Klingberg's motives for spying are not definitively known. Klingberg claimed that he spied out of ideological reasons, and that he was never paid. However, he told his interrogators that he had not completed his medical studies and lacked a diploma, and that the KGB had blackmailed him by threatening to expose this. 

In an interview after his release, Klingberg maintained that he had spied out of ideological reasons, but had lied to his interrogators and said he had been blackmailed so he would receive a lighter sentence. In an interview in 2014 he said that he also felt he owed the Russians a debt for saving the world from the Nazis. He said he had always been a communist, and had recruited his wife Wanda and two friends.

In 1988-89, Israeli attorney Amnon Zichroni, representing the State of Israel, worked out a deal in which Klingberg would be released, and the Soviet Union would release Ron Arad, an Israeli fighter pilot believed to be captured in Lebanon. The deal fell apart.

In 1997, Amnesty International appealed to the Israeli government to release Klingberg on medical grounds. Because of his failing health (he had several strokes), he was released to house arrest in October 1998. At his expense, a camera was installed in his apartment, which was hooked up to the offices of MALMAB (Ministry of Defense Security Authority) at the Kirya, Tel Aviv. His telephone was wiretapped, with his knowledge. Special guards who were working for the MALMAB were assigned to him, and Klingberg had to pay their salaries. Klingberg also signed a commitment not to speak about his work.

In order to pay the guards and for the camera in his home, Klingberg took loans, and eventually had to sell his apartment to repay them.

Release and later life
On 18 January 2003, Klingberg was released from house arrest. He immediately left for Paris to live with his daughter Sylvia and grandson Ian.

Klingberg lived in a one-room apartment in Paris, but did not take French citizenship. He frequently lectured on medicine at universities. He helped establish the Ludwik Fleck Center of the Collegium Helveticum - a university center in Zürich, and delivered the opening lecture. He received an officer's pension from the Israeli government, which in France amounted to around € 2,000 a month. Klingberg continued to have medical problems after his release, and was frequently hospitalized. He continued to take an interest in events in Israel, and read Hebrew newspapers.

Klingberg published his memoirs, HaMeragel Ha'akharon ("The Last Spy"), written together with his lawyer, Michael Sfard in 2007.

Klingberg died in Paris on 30 November 2015, aged 97. He was cremated, and his ashes were buried in the Père Lachaise Cemetery.

References

Sources
 Marcus Klingberg - Marcus Klingberg - Hameragel Ha'akharon ("Marcus Klingberg - The Last Spy" (Marcus Klingberg and Michael Sfard), Maariv Books; 2007.
 Marcus Klingberg, last KGB Spy to be Released in Israel
 "East Side Story": On Being an Epidemiologist in the Former USSR. An Interview with Marcus Klingberg. by Alfredo Morabia. Epidemiology. Volume 17, Number 1, January 2006.
 An Epidemiologist's Journey from Typhus to Thalidomide, and from the Soviet Union to Seveso. by Marcus Klingberg. J.R.Soc.Med. 2010: 103: 418-423. DOI 10. 1258/jrsm. 2010.

External links
 Medical Letter Writing Action dated 6 June 1997, by Amnesty International( urging Israel for him to be transferred to a less stressful environment or else released)
 IIBR official website

1918 births
2015 deaths
Israeli biologists
Israeli Ashkenazi Jews
Israeli military doctors
Israeli people convicted of spying for the Soviet Union
Israeli people of Polish-Jewish descent
Physicians from Warsaw
Polish emigrants to Israel
Polish expatriates in the Soviet Union
Soviet military personnel of World War II
Soviet military doctors
People granted political asylum in the Soviet Union
Polish Ashkenazi Jews
Recipients of the Order of the Red Banner of Labour
Burials at Père Lachaise Cemetery